Andawaththa Tyronne (born 10 May 1995) is a Sri Lankan cricketer. He made his first-class debut for Sri Lanka Ports Authority Cricket Club in the 2015–16 Premier League Tournament on 4 March 2016.

References

External links
 

1995 births
Living people
Sri Lankan cricketers
Sri Lanka Ports Authority Cricket Club cricketers
Sportspeople from Galle